The racquetball (Spanish: Ráquetbol) competition at the 2018 Central American and Caribbean Games in Barranquilla, Colombia is being held from 20 to 28 July 2018 at the Parque de Racquetas La Castellana.

Tournament format
The 2018 Central American and Caribbean Games racquetball competition has two parts: an individual competition with four divisions: Men’s and Women’s Singles and Doubles, as well as a team competition. The individual competitions will be played first beginning with a group stage played as a round robin. The group stage results used to seed teams for the medal  round. The individual competition group stages begin July 20 for three days followed by the medal round with the finals on July 25. The team competition will begin July 26 with the finals on July 28. The Men’s and Women’s Team events will be a best of three matches - 2 singles and 1 doubles.

Participating nations
A total of 8 countries have entered athletes.

Medal summary

Men's events

Women's events

Medal table

Women’s Singles

Pool A

Pool B

Pool C

Pool D

Medal Round

Men’s Singles

Pool A

Pool B

Pool C

Pool D

Medal Round

Women’s Doubles

Pool A

Pool B

Medal Round

Men’s Doubles

Pool A

Pool B

Medal Round

Women's team

Quarterfinals

Semifinals

Final

Men's team

Quarterfinals

Semifinals

Final

References

External links
2018 Central American and Caribbean Games – Racquetball

2018 Central American and Caribbean Games events
2018
Central American and Caribbean Games
2018 Central American and Caribbean Games
Qualification tournaments for the 2019 Pan American Games
Racquetball at multi-sport events